Stenomorphus is a genus of beetles in the family Carabidae, containing the following species:

 Stenomorphus angustatus Dejean, 1831
 Stenomorphus californicus (Menetries, 1843)
 Stenomorphus convexior Notman, 1922
 Stenomorphus cubanus Darlington, 1937
 Stenomorphus penicillatus Darlington, 1936
 Stenomorphus sinaloae Darlington, 1936

References

Harpalinae